The 2018 Colombian Census was the 18th population census in Colombia, and the 7th to include the counting of households and dwelling units. It was developed by the National Administrative Department of Statistics (DANE) of the Republic of Colombia, whose guidelines and rules were established by Decree 1899 of November 22, 2017.

Background and execution of the census 
Initially, the plan was to have several phases for the census: e-Census (virtual) from January 9 to March 8, 2018, and face-to-face visits to homes, which began in April and ended on June 30, 2018. However, due to technical difficulties with the census' virtual platform, the virtual phase was extended until April 12. In total, 5,048,492 people were counted online, and the face-to-face home visits began on April 18.

Subsequently, due to incidents with the construction of the Ituango Dam that forced the evacuation of several municipalities, the winter emergency, security problems in the Catatumbo region, and the change of government authorities, face-to-face visits to homes were extended until September, 2018. Some preliminary results were released in late August, and the final results were expected to be published on the third week of September. It was finally announced that the data would become official on October 30, 2018. The second delivery of preliminary results was made on November 6, 2018. As reported by DANE, the entire process of executing the census meant interviewing 32 million people with a budget of 310 million Colombian pesos.

Prior to this census, the last population census in Colombia was the 2005 Census, which was conducted between May 22, 2005 and May 22, 2006. According to the official projections that had been made from the records of that census, the population of Colombia in 2018 was expected to be about 49,834,240 inhabitants. However, the preliminary 2018 results counted only 45.5 million people. The final census results were announced at a press conference on July 4, 2019, when DANE revealed that 4.09 million people had been left out of the preliminary count due to "a series of failures in the collection of information." DANE then released the final estimate of 48,258,499 people living in Colombia.

Population by departments

Indicators 
The main indicators registered in the 2018 General Census were the following:

References 

2018
2018 in Colombia
Censuses by country
Demographics of Colombia